Kari Vikhagen Gjeitnes (born 13 January 1985) is a Norwegian cross-country skier.

She won a gold medal at the 2005 Junior World ski championships, made her World Cup debut in March 2005 in Drammen, and collected her first World Cup points with a 15th place the next year in the same city. She finished among the top ten for the first time in February 2008 in Otepää, and repeated that result in March 2009 in Trondheim. 

She represents the sports club Henning SL, and lives at Skåla in Molde.

Cross-country skiing results
All results are sourced from the International Ski Federation (FIS).

World Championships

World Cup

Season standings

Team podiums

 1 podium – (1 )

References

Norwegian female cross-country skiers
Sportspeople from Møre og Romsdal
1985 births
Living people